Muscular Christianity is a philosophical movement that originated in England in the mid-19th century, characterized by a belief in patriotic duty, discipline, self-sacrifice, masculinity, and the moral and physical beauty of athleticism. 

The movement came into vogue during the Victorian era as a method of building character in pupils at English public schools. It is most often associated with English author Thomas Hughes and his 1857 novel Tom Brown's School Days, as well as writers Charles Kingsley and Ralph Connor. American President Theodore Roosevelt was raised in a household that practised Muscular Christianity and was a prominent adherent to the movement. Roosevelt, Kingsley, and Hughes promoted physical strength and health as well as an active pursuit of Christian ideals in personal life and politics. Muscular Christianity has continued through organizations that combine physical and Christian spiritual development. It is influential within both Catholicism and Protestantism.

Origins and background 

Until the Age of Enlightenment, the aesthetics of the body within Christianity were concerned chiefly with holy suffering. Asceticism, and the denial of bodily needs and beauty, was of interest to laity and clergy alike in Antiquity and the medieval period. A key tenet of asceticism is believing the flesh to be a distraction from divinity. Sects such as Catharism believed the flesh to be wholly corrupted.

The Muscular Christianity movement was never officially organized. Instead, it was a cultural trend that manifested in different ways and was supported by various figures and churches. Muscular Christianity can be traced back to Paul the Apostle, who used athletic metaphors to describe the challenges of a Christian life. However, the explicit advocacy of sport and exercise in Christianity did not appear until 1762, when Rousseau's Emile described physical education as important for the formation of moral character.

Definitions and etymology 
The term "Muscular Christianity" became well known in a review by the barrister T. C. Sandars of Kingsley's novel Two Years Ago in the February 21, 1857 issue of the Saturday Review. The term had appeared slightly earlier.  Kingsley wrote a reply to this review in which he called the term "painful, if not offensive", but he later used it favorably on occasion.

In addition to the beliefs stated above, Muscular Christianity preached the spiritual value of sports, especially team sports.  As Kingsley said, "games conduce, not merely to physical, but to moral health".  An article on a popular nineteenth-century Briton summed it up thus: "John MacGregor is perhaps the finest specimen of Muscular Christianity that this or any other age has produced.  Three men seemed to have struggled within his breast—the devout Christian, the earnest philanthropist, the enthusiastic athlete."

Despite having gained some support, the concept was still controversial.  For one example, a reviewer mentioned "the ridicule which the 'earnest' and the 'muscular' men are doing their best to bring on all that is manly", though he still preferred earnestness' and 'muscular Christianity to eighteenth-century propriety. For another, a clergyman at Cambridge University horsewhipped another clergyman after hearing that he had said grace without mentioning Jesus because a Jew was present.  A commentator said, "All this comes, we fear, of Muscular Christianity."

Thomas Hughes 
Kingsley's contemporary Thomas Hughes is credited with helping to establish the main tenets of Muscular Christianity in Tom Brown at Oxford, which were physical manliness, chivalry and masculinity of character. In Tom Brown at Oxford, Hughes stated that "The Muscular Christians have hold of the old chivalrous and Christian belief, that a man's body is given to him to be trained and brought into subjection, and then used for the protection of the weak, the advancement of all righteous causes, and the subduing of the earth which God has given to the children of men." The notion of protecting the weak was related to contemporary English concerns over the plight of the poor, and Christian responsibility to one's neighbour.

Richard Andrew Meyer, a professor of Baylor University, explains Thomas Hughes's six definitions of Muscular Christianity through six criteria. Meyer wrote a dissertation about Thomas Hughes's notion of Muscular Christianity by analyzing the career of Lance Armstrong. The criteria are "1) a man’s body is given to him (by God); 2) and to be trained; 3) and brought into subjection; 4) and then used for the protection of the weak; 5) for the advancement of all righteous causes; 6) and for the subduing of the earth which God has given to the children of men."

England 
The idea of Muscular Christianity first started in England amidst industrialization and urbanization. Like their American counterparts, Christians in England were worried about the decrease in manliness among their followers as a result of Puritan influences, including passive virtues like love and tenderness, causing Muscular Christianity to become a cultural trend. It was not started by any specific person, but rather supported by churches and many individual Christian figures, who then spread it to other congregations. At the time it was believed that physical training built stamina necessary to perform service for others and that physical strength led to moral strength and good character. Christians increasingly felt that athletics could be a good outlet for burning off steam rather than finding a less moral outlet. Sports also helped to recruit new members into the church. Churches began forming their own sports teams and had the associated facilities for them built in or around the churches themselves. This is how YMCA (Young Men's Christian Association) began in 1844 in London, although it did not yet have sports facilities until 1869 with the establishment of New York City's YMCA.

These associations became very popular and YMCAs began appearing across the country. In 1894, an Anglican vicar, Reverend Arthur Osborne Montgomery Jay, built a gymnasium with a boxing ring in the basement of his East-End London church—Holy Trinity Shoreditch, organized a boxing club, and hosted large and popular boxing tournaments. Similar boxing outreach programs were established in the late-19th and early-20th centuries by Christian churches of various denominations in poor or working class areas of Britain and America.  These outreach efforts drew in many men, particularly younger men, to not only box but to be ministered to as well.

By 1901, Muscular Christianity was influential enough in England that one author could praise "the Englishman going through the world with rifle in one hand and Bible in the other" and add, "if asked what our muscular Christianity has done, we point to the British Empire." Muscular Christianity spread to other countries in the 19th century.  It was well entrenched in Australian society by 1860, though not always with much recognition of the religious element.

United States
In the United States it appeared first in private schools and then in YMCA and in the preaching of evangelists such as Dwight L. Moody. Scholar Iren Annus linked the growth of Muscular Christianity in the United States to broader societal changes which were occurring throughout the country, including the emancipation of women and the influx of immigrants who worked blue-collar jobs while white Anglo-Saxon Protestant men became increasingly white-collar. These factors contributed to increasing anxiety over masculinity among white males in the United States. Parodied by Sinclair Lewis in Elmer Gantry (though he had praised Oberlin College YMCA for its "positive earnest muscular Christianity") and out of step with theologians such as Reinhold Niebuhr, its influence declined in American mainline Protestantism.

Baylor University scholar Paul Putz summarises the purpose of Muscular Christianity as a mode to sanctify sports, positing that Muscular Christianity "sanctioned the physical activity of sports by giving it moral and religious value. Muscular Christians said that sports were not inherently sinful, nor were they simply entertainment and recreation; instead sports could be a way to develop and grow Christian character. You could become a better Christian through sport participation." An early pioneers of Muscular Christianity in the US was Amos Alonzo Stagg, a Yale-educated football coach, who in the 1880s sought to promote "Christian ideals" anchored in US middle class values such as "cooperation, belief in God, initiative, self-discipline, loyalty, respect for authority, courage, honesty."

At the same time, it made a significant impact on Evangelicalism in the United States, and was promoted by organizations such as the Fellowship of Christian Athletes, Athletes in Action, and the Promise Keepers. Theodore Roosevelt was one of the most prominent adherents of Muscular Christianity in the United States. Roosevelt believed that, "There is only a very circumscribed sphere of usefulness for the timid good man", a sentiment echoed by many at the time. Followers of Muscular Christianity ultimately found that the only solution to this was to connect faith to the physicality of the body.

An example sometimes given for US Muscular Christianity was the Men and Religion Forward Movement, organized by Fred Smith, a YMCA leader, in 1910. The movement held a mix of muscular, revivalistic and social gospel sensibilities, with work directed to evangelism, bible study, boys' work, mission, and social service. The organization hosted large revivals and campaigns throughout the US. Some 1.5 million men attended 7,000 events.

Muscular Christianity's popularity declined notably after World War I, when the horrors of the war caused disillusionment with Christianity in general. It appeared to be "mindless strenuosity tied not to social reform but to what cereal king J. H. Kellogg called the new religion ‘of being good to yourself’", that is, "such newly accessible leisure-time pursuits as automobiling and listening to the radio."

The spread of Muscular Christianity led to many changes within the Catholic Church. The services were changed to cater more towards men and priests were required to be of a certain "manly" stature. Priests who looked like this were thought to draw in more men like them. Protestant ministers in England and America argued that men were not truly Christians unless they were Muscular Christians. Muscular Christianity did later decline in some Protestant churches, but it never did disappear from the American religious landscape.

Asia 
Elwood Brown, physical director of the Manila chapter of the YMCA, heavily promoted Muscular Christianity in the Philippines, and co-founded the Far Eastern Championship Games which ran from 1914 to 1934. Japanese scholar Ikuo Abe argued that the modern sports ethic and sport culture in Japan was heavily influenced in its infancy by Christian missionaries and Western teachers during the 19th and 20th century. According to Abe, Japan's sport culture developed as a hybridization of Muscular Christianity and Bushido ethics. Muscular Christianity was also an influence on Swami Vivekananda's ideology of "muscular Hinduism" and Hindu nationalism, particularly his emphasis on physical prowess and masculinity.

Africa
According to Peter Alegi, muscular Christianity reached Africa through colonial mission schools during the late 19th century. Sports were incorporated directly into many mission schools to promote muscular Christianity, as administrators and missionaries believed sports such as football shared many of the same values. The effect mission schools like Adams College in South Africa had was seen through the demographics of football players, as a significant number of members at the earliest sports clubs in South Africa were Christian Africans. Over time these practices moved away from specific sports and more towards general physical education.

Muscular Christianity became widely noticed throughout Africa due to colonization. Men were meant to be the head of their households and it was viewed that this structure was deteriorating. It was the establishment of Western-style schools across the continent that brought about Muscular Christianity along with the introduction of European football teams. Soccer was thought to teach young boys self-restraint, fairness, honor, and success. It was also to develop them into disciplined, healthy, and moral citizens.  The purpose behind these soccer clubs was not just to bring idealized traits to the young boys, but to make them into strong soldiers and advocates for the Western world. Missionary schools were among the first to incorporate football into their programs, to make sure every student was playing. This was to blend the African and Western culture to transition the African students more easily into the world of Christianity.

Adams College, known as Amanzimtoti Training Institute before 1914, was one of the first and largest missionary schools in southern and central Africa. This school was important due to its football team, the Shooting Stars. This team was successful in competing against other teams throughout the area. Other missionary schools were known more for their success in other sports, like cricket or rugby.

Impact 

According to Nicholas Watson, the ideology of Muscular Christianity contributed to the development of the Olympic Games. Pierre de Coubertin, the founder of the modern Olympics, was greatly influenced by Muscular Christianity, and this was one of his primary inspirations alongside the Ancient Olympic Games of Greece.

In the 21st century, there has been a resurgence in the popularity of Muscular Christianity, driven by the disproportionately high number of men becoming atheist or agnostic, and by a perceived "crisis of masculinity". In the United States, Muscular Christianity is best represented by athletes such as Tim Tebow, Manny Pacquiao, Josh Hamilton, and Jeremy Lin. These athletes frequently speak and write about their faith, and share their beliefs with their fans.

New Calvinist pastors such as John Piper have pushed for an emphasis on a masculine Christianity and concept of Christ. Piper claimed that, "God revealed Himself in the Bible pervasively as king not queen; father not mother. Second person of the Trinity is revealed as the eternal Son not daughter; the Father and the Son create man and woman in His image and give them the name man, the name of the male." Because of this, Piper further claimed that "God has given Christianity a masculine feel."

Michael Kimmel argues in his book Manhood in America, that University of Notre Dame showcases Muscular Christianity because the school practices Catholicism. Male athletes on the varsity teams are thought to practice Thomas Hughes's six criteria for Muscular Christianity. Notre Dame's football team, for example, are Catholic men who believe their bodies are a gift from God. Therefore, they train their bodies in the name of God.

See also
Adams College
Anthony Joseph Drexel Biddle, Sr.
Biblical patriarchy
Christianity and association football – followers of Muscular Christianity established several of England's leading football teams
Christian manliness
Christian nationalism
Christian vegetarianism
Dominion theology
Fellowship of Christian Athletes
Muscular Judaism
New Testament athletic metaphors
Pauline Christianity
Physical culture
Positive Christianity
Ritualism in the Church of England
Sports ministry
YMCA

References

External links
 Research Project on YMCA, Amateur Sport in Asia, the Far Eastern Championship Games, and the Asian Games
 The Manly Christ: a New View. Robert Warren Conant. 1904.
 The Masculine Power of Christ; or, Christ Measured as a Man. Jason Noble Pierce. 1912.

1850s neologisms
19th-century Christianity
Christian movements
Christian personal development
Christian practices
Physical culture
Promise Keepers
Christianity and sports
Christian anthropology
Gender and Christianity